One World may refer to:

Music 
 One World (John Denver album), 1986
 One World (The Feelers album)
 One World (John Martyn album), 1977
 One World (John Tesh album), 1999
 One World (Uniting Nations album), 2005
 One World (Rare Earth album), 1971
 Peace Pipe (Redbone album), 2005; originally titled One World
 "One World" (RedOne song), 2018, RedOne featuring Adelina and Now United
 "One World Project", a musical supergroup formed to record a song for the 2004 Asian tsunami relief effort
 "One World", a song by the band Anthrax on their album Among the Living
 "One World", a song by the band Celtic Woman
 "One World", a song from The Cheetah Girls: One World
 "One World", a song by the band Dire Straits on their album Brothers in Arms
 "One World (Not Three)", a song by The Police on their album Ghost in the Machine
 "One World", a song by the singer TobyMac on his album Portable Sounds
 "One World", a song by the singer Nik Kershaw on his album The Works

Other media 
 One World (book), a 1943 book by Wendell Willkie
One World: The Ethics of Globalisation, a 2002 book by Peter Singer
 One World (imprint) of Random House
 One World (TV series), an American sitcom
 One World Film Festival, an annual human rights' documentary film festival in Prague
 Survivor: One World, the 24th season of Survivor
 The Cheetah Girls: One World, the name for the 3rd movie in the Cheetah Girls series
 One World: Together at Home, a virtual concert series by Global Citizen in support of the World Health Organization during the 2019–20 coronavirus pandemic

Organizations 
 Oneworld, an airline alliance
 One World Action, a London-based charity
 One World Cafe, a cafe and community kitchen in Salt Lake City, Utah, U.S.
 One World Media, a British trust for promoting relations between developed and developing countries through the media
 One World Trust, a UK education and research trust
 One World, an imprint of Random House

Other
 One World Trade Center, a building in New York

See also
 
 Oneworld (disambiguation)
 Our World (disambiguation)